Tamakairiki Tsuyoshi(born July 16, 1966 as Yukio Kawabe) is a Japanese former sumo wrestler and mixed martial artist from Shibuya, Tokyo who fought in Pride Fighting Championships and Pancrase. He was a wrestler in the top makuuchi division during his 14 years as a professional from 1982 until 1996, reaching a highest rank of maegashira 8 in 1992. He suffered a fracture of his right thumb in May 1993 which led to his eventual retirement in March 1996. Upon retirement he opened a chankonabe restaurant in his neighborhood of Shibuya, which now has branches in Musashi Koyama, Akasaka and Shandong. In 2009 he helped found the Japan Beach Sumo Federation, which aims to promote beach sumo as a healthy after-school activity for children. He is a father of two. His daughter is a member of idol group MAJOPICHU. His uncle is shogi player .

Sumo tournament record

Mixed martial arts record

|-
| Loss
| align=center| 0-3
| Yasuaki Miura
| Submission (armbar)
| Pancrase: Blow 4
| 
| align=center| 1
| align=center| 1:43
| Tokyo, Japan
| 
|-
| Loss
| align=center| 0-2
| Masayuki Kono
| Technical Submission (kimura)
| Pancrase: Spiral 5
| 
| align=center| 1
| align=center| 1:10
| Yokohama, Japan
| 
|-
| Loss
| align=center| 0-1
| Akira Shoji
| TKO (punches)
| Pride Bushido 3
| 
| align=center| 1
| align=center| 0:18
| Yokohama, Japan
|

See also
Glossary of sumo terms
List of past sumo wrestlers

References

External links
 

Japanese sumo wrestlers
Japanese male mixed martial artists
Mixed martial artists utilizing Sumo
Living people
1966 births